Multimedia is an album by multi-instrumentalist Ira Sullivan which was recorded in 1979 and released on the Galaxy label in 1981.

Reception

The AllMusic review by Scott Yanow stated "Among the highlights of the fairly straightforward program are a swinging "Anthropology," "Painted Ladies (A Confiscated Bolero)" and "Autumn Leaves." A fine effort".

Track listing
 "Anthropology" (Charlie Parker, Dizzy Gillespie) – 7:25	
 "Multimedia" (Ira Sullivan) – 4:46
 "Painted Ladies (A Confiscated Bolero)" (Joe Diorio, John Heard, Billy Higgins) – 9:23
 "Autumn Leaves" (Joseph Kosma, Jacques Prévert, Johnny Mercer) – 8:19	
 "Strut" (Ira Sullivan, Kenneth Nash) – 9:28

Personnel
Ira Sullivan – flute, soprano saxophone, tenor saxophone, trumpet
Joe Diorio – guitar (tracks 1–4)
Monty Budwig (track 5), John Heard (tracks 1–4) – bass
Billy Higgins – drums (tracks 1–4)
Kenneth Nash – congas, percussion, vocals

References

Galaxy Records albums
Ira Sullivan albums
1982 albums